Sweet Sorrow is a South Korean male vocal group formed in 2002. Originally a quartet, its current members consist of In Ho-jin, Song Woo-jin and Kim Young-woo. In 2019, they joined with female vocal group The Barberettes and performed together under the name "SBSB" (Hangul: 스바스바).

History
In Ho-jin, Song Woo-jin, Sung Jin-hwan and pianist Kim Young-woo first met around 1996 as students at Yonsei University and were all members of the university glee club. Together with four other friends, they formed their own eight-member a cappella group and received a positive response. The name "Sweet Sorrow" was taken from the quote "Parting is such sweet sorrow" in Romeo and Juliet and was conceived by Kim, an English literature major, as a reminder of the hardship they had gone through together. Only the four of them chose to pursue music professionally and debuted in 2002.

After a stint performing cover songs at college festivals and events, the quartet came to national prominence by winning the Daesang (Grand Prize) at the 16th Yoo Jae-ha Music Competition for their original song "Sweet Sorrow". They were signed by the company Mezoo Cultures and released their first album in 2005. They also came to prominence with a much larger audience for performing the soundtracks of popular television dramas and their appearances on the MBC singing competition Show Survival (쇼바이벌) and the KBS music program Immortal Songs: Singing the Legend. 

In December 2017, Sung announced that he would be a hiatus due to health reasons and later left permanently. Sweet Sorrow returned as a trio in 2019 with a new album. They also combined with The Barberettes to form a mixed group called "SBSB" and performed together on Immortal Songs.

Discography

Studio albums

Extended plays

Singles

Awards and nominations

References

External links

A cappella musical groups
South Korean boy bands
South Korean pop music groups
South Korean contemporary R&B musical groups
Yonsei University alumni